Jhuruli Adarsha Vidyapith (H.S) is a Higher Secondary school in Jhuruli, in the state of West Bengal, India near the town Basirhat. It is a co-educational school established in 1974 and is run by the Department of School Education. It is affiliated with the West Bengal Board of Secondary Education and West Bengal Council of Higher Secondary Education. There have been 39 graduating classes only included with VIII and X grade school so far. It prioritizes the admission of students from the villages closest to the school.

Educational development
The grade levels in the school run from 5th to (10+2)th grades. The school was recently board-approved for the higher secondary education standard. The higher secondary level developed by great sum of school authority and has been successful in 2014 as its fruit of efforts put behind it. The government owns of the land where the school stands.

Facilities 
This school runs by West Bengal Board of Secondary Education and West Bengal Council of Higher Secondary Education and gives facilities to merited students. It helps poor students with lower fees.

It has a vocational course related to phone and computer repairing and hard working that build the students' futured.

The computer lab consists of 10 IBM PCs. All are LAN connected accompanied with UPS. Every computer has Windows XP as operating system and all other language packages which are necessary for the syllabus prescribed by the West Bengal Board of Secondary Education and West Bengal Council of Higher Secondary Education.

Gallery

References

External links

High schools and secondary schools in West Bengal
Schools in North 24 Parganas district
Educational institutions established in 1974
1974 establishments in West Bengal